The 2nd Mounted Division was a cavalry division that served as part of the Egyptian Expeditionary Force in Palestine in World War I.  It was formed in April 1918 when three brigades already in Palestine were merged with elements of the 2nd Indian Cavalry Division withdrawn from the Western Front. In July 1918, the division was renamed as the 5th Cavalry Division. It remained in Palestine after the end of the war on occupation duties until finally broken up in 1920.

Formation

2nd Mounted Division
In March 1918, the 2nd Indian Cavalry Division was broken up in France.  The Canadian (Canadian Cavalry Brigade) and British units (notably 7th Dragoon Guards, 8th Hussars and N and X Batteries RHA) remained in France and the Indian elements were sent to Egypt.

By an Egyptian Expeditionary Force GHQ Order of 12 April 1918, the mounted troops of the EEF were reorganised when the Indian Army units arrived in theatre.  On 24 April 1918, the 2nd Mounted Division was formed on the Indian Establishment.  This new formation should not be confused with the original 2nd Mounted Division that saw action in the Gallipoli Campaign, though the 5th and 7th Mounted Brigades served in both.
the 5th Mounted Brigade was transferred from the Australian Mounted Division and merged with elements of the 3rd (Ambala) Cavalry Brigade
the 7th Mounted Brigade (which had been acting in an independent role) was merged with elements of the 9th (Secunderabad) Cavalry Brigade
the Imperial Service Cavalry Brigade (which had been on service in Egypt and Palestine since 1914) joined as the division's third brigade
two of the Yeomanry Regiments were merged (1/1st Warwickshire Yeomanry of the 5th Mounted Brigade and the 1/1st South Nottinghamshire Hussars of 7th Mounted Brigade) to form B Battalion, Machine Gun Corps; it was posted to France, arriving in June.  The 1/1st Queen's Own Worcestershire Hussars became the XX Corps Cavalry Regiment.  They were replaced by Indian Cavalry Regiments from France.  
the Field Ambulances and Mobile Veterinary Sections merged with their Indian counterparts.    
the Essex Battery, RHA and ammunition column joined with 7th Mounted Brigade.
Other divisional elements were raised for the new division.

5th Cavalry Division
On 22 July 1918, the 2nd Mounted Division was renumbered as the 5th Cavalry Division and the brigades as the 13th, 14th and 15th (Imperial Service) Cavalry Brigades.  The sub units (Signal Troops, Combined Cavalry Field Ambulances and Mobile Veterinary Sections) were renumbered on the same date.

Battles

The 2nd Mounted / 5th Cavalry Division served with the Desert Mounted Corps for the rest of the war, taking part in the Second Transjordan Raid (30 April to 4 May 1918, 15th I.S. Brigade only), Affair of Abu Tellul (14 July), and the Final Offensive including the Battle of Megiddo (1925 September), Capture of Haifa (23 September, 15th I.S. Brigade only) and Damascus (1 October), Affair of Haritan (26 October, 15th I.S. Brigade only) and Occupation of Aleppo (26 October).

The division remained in Palestine on occupation duties after the end of the war.  However, demobilization began immediately and most of the British war time units had left by the middle of 1919. 14th Cavalry Brigade was broken up in September 1919, and the 15th (I.S.) Cavalry Brigade in January 1920.  The division (and 13th Cavalry Brigade) was finally broken up in April 1920.

See also

 4th Cavalry Division (British Indian Army) formed at the same time in a similar manner.
 List of Indian divisions in World War I

Notes

References

Bibliography
 
 
 
 

British Indian Army divisions
Indian World War I divisions
Military units and formations established in 1918
Military units and formations disestablished in 1920
British cavalry divisions
1918 establishments in British-administered Palestine